NRC Health was set up in 1981 and now is based in Lincoln, Nebraska. The company focuses on collecting many volumes of healthcare consumer data, as well as creating healthcare products and subscription-based solutions (analytics, program, and insights) in the United States and Canada.

History 
 1981 - National Research Corporation was established.
 1994 - Picker Institute was established and began to develop the Qualisys technology in the next year.
 1998 - The company completed the acquisition of Healthcare Research Systems, Inc. for its patient experience surveys.
 2001 - The company announced the purchase of Picker Institute's healthcare survey business, for new growth market. 
 2003 -The company completed the acquisition of Smaller World Communications in Canada.
 2005 -The company completed the acquisition of Geriatric Health Systems LLC, indicating the beginning of the company’s Health Risk Assessments solutions.
 2006 -The company completed the acquisition of TGI Group LLC to establish The Governance Institute.
 2009 - The company completed the acquisition of My InnerView, famous for its long term care quality measurement and satisfaction surveys.
 2010 - The company completed the acquisition of OCS HomeCare, famous for its home health and hospice clinical and outcomes analytics.
 2014 - National Research Corporation completed the acquisition of Digital Assent, the first software company to publish star ratings from patient experience surveys.
 2016 - National Research Corporation rebrands to NRC Health.
2020 - On Feb. 11th NRC Health suffered a cyber-attack which caused a company wide shutdown of operations.

Awards 
NRC Health annually provides  Consumer Choice Awards, AHCA/NCAL Nat’l Quality Award, and Excellence in Action.
 2010 - National Research was recognized as CMS (Centers for Medicare & Medicaid Services) approved for HHCAHPS.
 2012, 2013 – The company was named the largest patient satisfaction measurement firm in the U.S. by Modern Healthcare.

Products and services

NRC Health’s services based on its capability of data interpretation, transmittal, and benchmarking from consumers. The company’s growth solutions are marketed under the Healthcare Market Guide and Ticker brands, retention solutions are under the NRC Picker, My InnerView, and NRC Canada brands, thought leadership solutions are under The Governance Institute brand name. The Company’s clients include acute and post-acute care providers or other payer organizations.
Products and solutions provided by NRC Health aims at the philosophy of "Eight Dimensions of Patient-Centered Care". Under this strategy, the company provides Patient & Family Experience, Resident & Family Experience, Employee Engagement, Physician Engagement, The Consumer Assessment of Healthcare Providers and Systems (CAHPS) program, Market Insights, Healthcare Analytics, Clinical & Outcomes Analytics, Health Risk Assessments, Patient Outreach Programs, Integrated Solutions, and The Institutes. CAHPS is a survey system, including HCAHPS, CGCAHPS, HHCAHPS, NHCAHPS, Pediatric HCAHPS, ICHCAHPS.

References

External links 
 

Companies based in Lincoln, Nebraska
Consulting firms established in 1981
Companies listed on the Nasdaq